Mike Phillips may refer to:

 Mike Phillips (baseball) (born 1950), American former professional baseball player
 Mike Phillips (basketball) (1956–2015), American basketball player
 Mike Phillips (illustrator) (born 1961), British children's book illustrator
 Mike Phillips (Montana politician) (born 1958), Montana State Representative
 Mike Phillips (rugby union) (born 1982), Welsh international rugby union footballer 
 Mike Phillips (writer) (born 1941), British writer
 Mike Phillips, director
 Mike Phillips (1930–1999), Mohawk elder and Native American actor, played Sachem in The Last of the Mohicans (1992)
 Mike Phillips (speech recognition) (born 1961), pioneer in machine learning and speech recognition
 Michael Brandon (pornographic actor) (born 1965), sometimes credited as Mike Phillips
 Mike Phillips (footballer) (born 1933), Scottish footballer

See also
 Michael Phillips (disambiguation)